Vlaamse Hollywood Vrouwen is Belgian reality television series airing on VTM that premiered on 13 October 2010.

Overview
Starring : Astrid Bryan, Nora Novac, Greet Ramaekers en Linda Op De Beeck

References

External links
https://web.archive.org/web/20101015041451/http://vtm.be/vlaamse-hollywood-vrouwen
http://www.imdb.com/title/tt1794666/

Flemish television shows
VTM (TV channel) original programming